Blodplättar (in Swedish; blodpannekaker in Norwegian, veriohukainen, verilätty or verilettu in Finnish; verikäkk in Estonian), or blood pancakes in English are a dish served in Finland, Estonia, Sweden and Norway made of whipped blood (typically reindeer blood), water or pilsner, flour and eggs. It is similar to black pudding, but is thinner and crispier.

Blodplättar may be fried in a frying pan. The pancakes are usually served with crushed lingonberries or lingonberry jam, sometimes with pork or reindeer meat.

In Swedish, the word may also be used to refer to blood platelets.

See also
Blodpalt

References

External links
 Picture of Finnish veriohukainen

Estonian cuisine
Finnish cuisine
Norwegian cuisine
Swedish cuisine
Blood dishes
Pancakes